The Pike Place Starbucks store, also known as the Original Starbucks, is the first Starbucks store, established in 1971 at Pike Place Market, in the downtown core of Seattle, Washington, United States. It has kept its early appearance over time, and is subject to design guidelines and historic significance. It is known for tourist attraction and hosting crowds. While commonly referred to as the first Starbucks location, the current address is the second for the Pike Place store. The first restaurant was located at 2000 Western Avenue for five years. It is currently located in 1912 Pike Place.

References

External links

 
 Our Heritage, Starbucks

1971 establishments in Washington (state)
Coffee in Seattle
Pike Place Market
Restaurants in Seattle
Starbucks
Tourist attractions in Seattle
Central Waterfront, Seattle